The 2011 Natomas Men's Professional Tennis Tournament was a professional tennis tournament played on hard courts. It was the seventh edition of the tournament which was part of the 2011 ATP Challenger Tour. It took place in Sacramento, United States between 3 and 9 October 2011.

Singles main-draw entrants

Seeds

 1 Rankings are as of September 26, 2011.

Other entrants
The following players received wildcards into the singles main draw:
  Fernando González
  Nicholas Monroe
  Jack Sock
  Sam Querrey

The following players received entry as a special exempt into the singles main draw:
  Robert Farah

The following players received entry from the qualifying draw:
  Pierre-Ludovic Duclos
  Steve Johnson
  Blake Strode
  Michael Venus

The following players received entry from a lucky loser spot:
  Jamie Baker

Champions

Singles

 Ivo Karlović def.  James Blake, 6–4, 3–6, 6–4

Doubles

 Carsten Ball /  Chris Guccione def.  Nicholas Monroe /  Jack Sock, 7–6(7–3), 1–6, [10–5]

External links
Official Website
ITF Search 
ATP official site

 
Natomas Men's Professional Tennis Tournament